Darzi Kola (also Romanized as Darzī Kolā and Darzī Kalā; also known as Darzī Kūlā) is a village in Banaft Rural District, Dodangeh District, Sari County, Mazandaran Province, Iran. At the 2006 census, its population was 123, in 35 families.

References 

Populated places in Sari County